Shelley Heath (born 6 June 2000) is an Australian rules footballer playing for the Melbourne Football Club in the AFL Women's competition (AFLW). Heath was drafted by Melbourne with the club's fourth selection and the 44th pick overall in the 2018 AFL Women's draft.

References

External links 

2000 births
Living people
Melbourne Football Club (AFLW) players
Australian rules footballers from Victoria (Australia)
Dandenong Stingrays players (NAB League Girls)